Drăgești is a commune in Bihor County, Crișana, Romania with a population of 2,586 people. It is composed of five villages: Dicănești (Dékányos), Drăgești, Stracoș (Isztrákos), Tășad (Tasádfő) and Topești (Toposd).

References 

Communes in Bihor County
Localities in Crișana